William Miles was launched at Quebec in 1853, but immediately transferred her registry to Bristol. She made several voyages carrying migrants to Australia and New Zealand. She was wrecked in May 1868.

Career
William Miles first appeared in Lloyd's Register (LR) in 1854. She was sheathed in felt and yellow metal in 1854.

In 1855 William Miles carried some 260 emigrants from Scotland to Moreton Bay, in what is now Queensland. She left England in 1854, arrived at Port Jackson on 16 January 1855, and arrived at Moreton Bay on 19 January.

William Miles sailed from Bristol on 5 May 1860 and arrived at Lyttelton, New Zealand on 21 August with 96 immigrants. She sailed on to Otago with merchandise and some passengers on 1 October.

William Miles, Brindsen, master, sailed from the Gravesend on 26 July 1862 with some 322,or 336 emigrants to New Zealand. She arrived on 12 November at Albertland.

William Miles sailed from Gravesend, Kent on 3 July 1864. She arrived at Lyttelton on 22 October.

Fate
William Miles was wrecked on 20 May 1868 at Pensacola, Florida, United States. She was on a voyage from Pensacola to Queenstown, County Cork.

Notes

Citations

References
 
 

1853 ships
Ships built in Quebec
Age of Sail merchant ships of England
Migrant ships to Australia
Migrant ships to New Zealand
Maritime incidents in May 1868